Lauren Rollin (born 21 November 1990) is an Australian former professional racing cyclist, who rode professionally between 2012 and 2021.

A female road cyclist from New South Wales, Australia, Rollin studied a Bachelor of Planning at the University of NSW in Sydney part-time as well as cycling for NSW and Australia at local, interstate and international events.

In September 2016 she was announced as part of the  squad for 2017. She left the team after one season, joining  for the 2018 season.

Rollin announced her retirement from professional cycling in May 2021. Lauren Rollin married former professional Canadian cyclist Dominique Rollin in 2021.

Major results

2007
 7th Road race, UCI Juniors World Championships
2009
 10th Road race, Oceania Road Cycling Championships
2011
 National Road Championships
1st  Under-23 criterium
1st  Under-23 time trial
8th Time trial
 4th Open de Suède Vårgårda TTT
2012
 National Road Championships
2nd Under-23 time trial
3rd Under-23 criterium
10th Time trial
 7th Knokke-Heist – Bredene
2013
 1st  Criterium, National Under-23 Road Championships
 5th 7-Dorpenomloop Aalburg
 5th Open de Suède Vårgårda TTT
 6th Sparkassen Giro Bochum
 10th Overall Ladies Tour of Qatar
2014
 National Road Championships
2nd Road race
3rd Criterium
2015
 Oceania Road Cycling Championships
1st  Road race
2nd  Time trial
 1st Overall Tour of Zhoushan Island
1st Points classification
1st Stage 2
 1st Ronde van Overijssel
 2nd Overall The Princess Maha Chackri Sirindhon's Cup
1st Stage 2
 2nd Overall Bay Classic Series
 4th Overall Women's Tour of New Zealand
 7th Omloop van het Hageland
 10th Open de Suède Vårgårda
2016
 2nd 7-Dorpenomloop Aalburg
 2nd Trofee Maarten Wynants
 National Road Championships
3rd Criterium
5th Road race
 3rd Overall Santos Women's Tour
 4th Omloop van de IJsseldelta
 5th Cadel Evans Great Ocean Road Race
 6th Pajot Hills Classic
 8th Ronde van Drenthe
 9th Le Samyn des Dames
 9th Strade Bianche Women
 9th Trofeo Alfredo Binda-Comune di Cittiglio
2017
 4th Overall Santos Women's Tour
 10th Omloop van het Hageland
2018
 1st Grand Prix International d'Isbergues
 1st La Picto–Charentaise
 2nd Road race, National Road Championships
 3rd Le Samyn
 6th Cadel Evans Great Ocean Road Race
2019
 2nd La Picto–Charentaise
 8th Grand Prix International d'Isbergues
2020
 3rd Grand Prix International d'Isbergues

References

External links
 
 

1990 births
Living people
Australian female cyclists
Cyclists from New South Wales
20th-century Australian women
21st-century Australian women